Unlike other countries, in the Maldives, they use 'names' to distinguish between one house from the other. In the archipelago of 1200 islands, 200 of them are inhabited. In all these inhabited islands, houses are identified by their unique name rather than a post code or a zip code. However, on different islands, the name of the house can be repeated, but not on the same island.

Recently, in the capital 'Male', there have been efforts made to give postcodes to a block of houses rather than a specific building or a house unit. Maldives Post's website provides a 'post code finder' given the house name or island name or road name.

Some of the notable house names include Theemuge (Presidential Palace) and Muliaage (Official Presidential Residence). Note the use of 'ge' at the end of each name of the house which in Maldivian literally means 'house'

External links
 Maldives Post code search

Postal system of the Maldives